Anarkali is a 1966 Malayalam-language romance film based on the historical love story between Prince Salim and Anarkali. Directed and produced by Kunchacko, the film was a direct adaptation of the 1953 Hindi film of the same name. The film stars Prem Nazir and K. R. Vijaya, with Sathyan, Thikkurissy, Ambika and Kottarakkara Sreedharan Nair playing other major roles.

Cast
 Prem Nazir as Prince Salim
 K. R. Vijaya as Anarkali / Nadira
 Sathyan as Akbar
 Thikkurissy as Jaya Singhan 
 Ambika Sukumaran as Jodhabai
 Kottarakkara Sreedharan Nair as Mana Singhan
 Rajasree (Gracy) as Gulnar
 Adoor Bhasi as Karim
 S. P. Pillai as Kasim
 Alummoodan (debut) as Afghani warrior
 Philomina as Anaarkkali's Mother
 Manavalan Joseph as Slave Trader
 K. J. Yesudas as Tansen
 L. P. R. Varma as Court Singer

The film's cast includes playback singer K. J. Yesudas and music director L. P. R. Varma playing small roles. Yesudas played Tansen, who was a pioneer in Indian music and one of Akbar's Navaratnas. In a scene, Yesudas lip-syncs a song which was sung by P. B. Sreenivas.

Historical inaccuracies
 The film was completely shot from Kunchacko's Udaya Studio and failed in setting the Moghul era on screen.
 Akbar's wife Mariam-uz-Zamani is called Jodhabai in the film. Though she has been also referred to by this name in modern times, she was never known as such during her lifetime.

Soundtrack
The music was composed by M. S. Baburaj and the lyrics were written by Vayalar Ramavarma.

See also
 Mughal-e-Azam, a Bollywood adaptation of Prince Salim-Anarkali story

References

External links
 
 peppermediacreation.com

1966 films
1960s Malayalam-language films
Films set in the Mughal Empire
1960s romance films
Films set in the 16th century
Films directed by Kunchacko
Cultural depictions of Akbar
Cultural depictions of Tansen
Cultural depictions of Jahangir
Indian romance films